Merchant Taylors' Boys' School, Crosby is an independent day school, located in Great Crosby on Merseyside.

The school's motto is that of the Worshipful Company of Merchant Taylors: Concordia Parvae Res Crescunt (Small Things Grow in Harmony).

History
The school was founded in 1620 under the instruction of the estate of John Harrison, a citizen and Merchant Taylor of London, who was born in Great Crosby, and was run under the auspices of the Merchant Taylors' Company until 1910. In 1878, the school moved to its present site, some 1,000 yards from the previous, which now forms part of the Merchant Taylors' Girls' School, with whom the school shares a Governing Board and Bursar. Kidde was apparently sacked from the post in 1651 on the grounds of mismanagement although it is thought he was forced out by Roman Catholic Sympathizers on account of his Puritan/Presbyterian ways.

Present day
Until the 1970s, Merchant Taylors' was also a boarding school. It currently caters for over 700 day pupils between the ages of 11 and 18 (with an additional 120 in the Junior School). Lessons run Monday-Friday, 08:40-16:00 (A Saturday working day was abolished in 1981). As a result of these longer school days, holidays are frequently several weeks longer than local education authority dates.

The school is independently run, and, as such, charges tuition fees. Fees were partially subsidised by the Government under the Assisted Places Scheme until the closure of that scheme in 2001. The Schools now run their own means tested Assisted Places Scheme under which about 20% of pupils benefit from free, or reduced-fee places. The schools offer around £1 million a year in bursaries. About 17 per cent of pupils at the two senior schools receive assistance, worth up to 100 per cent of the £11,394 annual fees.

Academically, the School sees around 60% of grades awarded at A* and A at GCSE and, consistently excellently at A-Level, where 80% and above of grades have been recorded at A*-B. 2012 saw record results at A Level, with the percentage of grades awarded at A* and A 62.3%.
The School also enters students for a range of other public examinations, including Extended Project Qualifications, which have been offered since 2011.
 
In 2013, Merchant Taylors’ was Crosby’s best performing school with 98% of pupils at the boys’ school achieving five Cs or above in any subject at GCSE.

Sports and extracurricular activities
The primary sports played by the school are rugby union, field hockey and cricket, however association football as well as samoan cricket have both recently been introduced as an 'official' school sport and looks set to challenge the more established sports over the coming years.

The school also has a boat house which is currently on loan to Southport Dragon Boat Club, in the nearby town of Southport for its rowing team. The rowing team compete in national races with a number of boys competing at national level every year.

The rugby coaching staff includes former Scottish international Ian McKie, and included Mike Slemen, former England and British and Irish Lions international and England team selector until his death in 2020.

The school also has a Combined Cadet Force, run in conjunction with Merchant Taylors' Girls' School, headed by Contingent Commander, Major (CCF) Helen Irwin. Her predecessors include Lieutenant Colonel (CCF), Mike Slemen, Squadron Leader Mark Stanley RAFAC (formerly RAFVR(T)) and Lieutenant Colonel (CCF), Paul Irvine. The Army section of MTS CCF is badged as Duke of Lancaster's Regiment (King's Regiment until July 2006). In 2015, Merchant Taylors' CCF celebrated its centenary year. A new banner was presented in the nearby St. Faith's Church, with The Duke of York in attendance. 

In December 2011, the £5.5m Ian Robinson Sports Centre was opened. Facilities include a climbing wall, fitness suite, sports hall and dance studio. The Sports Centre is named after ex Head of Rugby, Ian Robinson, who died on a school sports tour in Australia after a white water rafting accident in 2007.
Other facilities include a heated indoor swimming pool on site (which is now no longer in use due to maintenance issues), a language laboratory, extensive playing fields, fully equipped science laboratories, an art and design suite, cricket nets, a self-contained music block and a share of Northern Club's facilities.

Notable pupils

Alumni of MTS Crosby are known as "Old Crosbeians"
James Allen, (Formula One commentator)
Professor John E. Baldwin, FRS, pioneering radio astronomer and fellow of Queens' College Cambridge
Tony Barrow, the Beatles' press officer 1962–1968
Matthew Baylis, novelist and screenwriter
Alan Blackshaw, mountaineer
James Burnie, Liberal MP for Bootle
John Culshaw, record producer and television executive
George Kruger Gray, designer
Dick Greenwood, rugby international and Captain of the England team
Professor Anthony Heath (1942–), sociologist, fellow of Nuffield College
Professor Philip Ingham FRS, developmental geneticist, Toh Kian Chui Distinguished Professor, Lee Kong Chian School of Medicine, Singapore
Simon Jack, BBC finance reporter
Ben Kay, of the England Rugby World Cup winning side of 2003
Bruce Kenrick, founder, Shelter housing charity
Matt Kelly, founder and editor-in-chief of The New European
Prof Robert Legget, civil engineer
Spencer Leigh, journalist and popular music historian
Sir Hardman Lever, accountant
Charles James Mathews, actor
Thomas Eric Peet, Egyptologist
Nigel Rees, broadcaster and author
Samuel Roukin, actor
Robert Runcie, Archbishop of Canterbury 1980–1991
Phil Sayer broadcaster 
William Snowden, cricketer
Sir John Walton,  barrister and politician
Sir Charles Kingsley Webster, historian
Barrie Wells, insurance entrepreneur and sports philanthropist 
Donald J. West, Emeritus Professor of Clinical Criminology, University of Cambridge
Ronald White, amateur golfer
Bertie Wilson, Second Engineer on RMS Titanic
The Witty brothers: Arthur Witty and Ernest Witty, footballers

Headmasters

Notable teachers and staff
 Dame Jean Davies, Director of the Women's Royal Naval Service
 John Pugh, Liberal Democrat MP for Southport
 Mike Slemen, former England and British and Irish Lions international and England team selector

See also
Listed buildings in Great Crosby

References

External links
  School website
 HMC inspection report, 1998
 Independent Schools' Inspectorate report, 2004

Member schools of the Headmasters' and Headmistresses' Conference
Worshipful Company of Merchant Taylors
Educational institutions established in the 1620s
Private schools in the Metropolitan Borough of Sefton
1620 establishments in England
Crosby, Merseyside
Boys' schools in Merseyside